Nouzha Chekrouni (born 1955, Meknes) is a Senior Fellow in Advanced Leadership at Harvard University who holds a Doctorate degree in linguistics from Sorbonne Nouvelle in Paris. She was a politician of the Socialist Union of Popular Forces party of Morocco and a Delegate-Minister for the Moroccans Living Abroad in the cabinet of Driss Jettou (2002–2007), Delegate-Minister for Women Conditions, Family and Children Protection and Secretary of State for the Handicapped in the cabinet of Abderrahman el-Yousfi (1998–2002). Since January 2009 she is Ambassador of Morocco to Canada. Dr. Chekrouni was professor of linguistics in the Faculty of Arts & Social Sciences at the university of Meknes.

See also
Cabinet of Morocco

References

External links
Embassy of Morocco to Canada

1955 births
Living people
People from Meknes
Moroccan educators
Moroccan women educators
Socialist Union of Popular Forces politicians
21st-century Moroccan politicians
21st-century Moroccan women politicians
Government ministers of Morocco
Women government ministers of Morocco
Ambassadors of Morocco
Ambassadors of Morocco to Canada
Moroccan women diplomats
Moroccan women ambassadors